In classical logic, disjunctive syllogism (historically known as modus tollendo ponens (MTP), Latin for "mode that affirms by denying") is a valid argument form which is a syllogism having a disjunctive statement for one of its premises.

An example in English:
 The breach is a safety violation, or it is not subject to fines.
 The breach is not a safety violation.
 Therefore, it is not subject to fines.

Propositional logic
In propositional logic, disjunctive syllogism (also known as disjunction elimination and or elimination, or abbreviated ∨E), is a valid rule of inference. If it is known that at least one of two statements is true, and that it is not the former that is true; we can infer that it has to be the latter that is true. Equivalently, if P is true or Q is true and P is false, then Q is true. The name "disjunctive syllogism" derives from its being a syllogism, a three-step argument, and the use of a logical disjunction (any "or" statement.) For example, "P or Q" is a disjunction, where P and Q are called the statement's disjuncts.  The rule makes it possible to eliminate a disjunction from a logical proof. It is the rule that

where the rule is that whenever instances of "", and "" appear on lines of a proof, "" can be placed on a subsequent line.

Disjunctive syllogism is closely related and similar to hypothetical syllogism, which is another rule of inference involving a syllogism. It is also related to the law of noncontradiction, one of the three traditional laws of thought.

Formal notation 
For a logical system that validates it, the disjunctive syllogism may be written in sequent notation as

 

It may be expressed as a truth-functional tautology or theorem in the object language of propositional logic as

Natural language examples 
Here is an example:
 I will choose soup or I will choose salad.
 I will not choose soup.
 Therefore, I will choose salad.

Here is another example:
 It is red or it is blue.
 It is not blue.
 Therefore, it is red.

Inclusive and exclusive disjunction 
It may be observed that the disjunctive syllogism works whether 'or' is considered 'exclusive' or 'inclusive' disjunction. See below for the definitions of these terms.

There are two kinds of logical disjunction:

 inclusive means "and/or"—at least one of them is true, or maybe both.
 exclusive ("xor") means exactly one must be true, but they cannot both be.

The concept of "or" as it exists in the English language is often ambiguous between these two meanings, but the difference is pivotal in evaluating disjunctive arguments.

The argument
 P or Q.
 Not P.
 Therefore, Q.

is valid and indifferent between both meanings. However, only in the exclusive meaning is the following form valid:

 Either (only) P or (only) Q.
 P.
 Therefore, not Q.

With the inclusive meaning, one could draw no conclusion from the first two premises of that argument. See affirming a disjunct.

Related argument forms
Unlike modus ponens and modus ponendo tollens, with which it should not be confused, disjunctive syllogism is often not made an explicit rule or axiom of logical systems, as the above arguments can be proven with a combination of reductio ad absurdum and disjunction elimination.

Other forms of syllogism include:
hypothetical syllogism
categorical syllogism

Disjunctive syllogism holds in classical propositional logic and intuitionistic logic, but not in some paraconsistent logics.

See also 
 Stoic logic

References

Rules of inference
Theorems in propositional logic
Classical logic
Paraconsistent logic